The following is a list of people who were born in or associated with Oxford, Mississippi. While it does not include those whose only connection with Oxford is attending the University of Mississippi, it includes faculty and alumni who have resided there and contributed to the life of the community.

Activists and advocates

 Nathan Bedford Forrest II (1872-1931), Ku Klux Klan leader, born in Oxford
 Angela McGlowan (born 1970), Republican political commentator, author, and consulting firm CEO
 James Meredith (born 1933), activist, first African-American student at the University of Mississippi

Actors and models
 Karlous Miller (born 1983), actor, comedian, born in Oxford
 Kimberly Morgan (born 1983), Miss Mississippi 2007, born in Oxford
 Naomi Sims (1948–2009), fashion model and author, born in Oxford

Artists and designers
 Jere Allen (born 1944), painter
 Henry Clifford Boles (1910–1979), architect
 Theora Hamblett (1895–1977), primitive painter
 John McCrady (1911–1968), painter
 Sulton Rogers (1922–2003), folk artist
 Glennray Tutor (born 1950), photorealist painter
 Dick Waterman (born 1935), photographer and blues promoter

Athletes and sports figures
 Coolidge Ball, first African-American athlete to play at Ole Miss (basketball)
 Mike Bianco (born 1967), college baseball coach
 Billy Brewer (born 1935), college football coach
 Billy Clay (born 1944), NFL cornerback, born in Oxford
 Steve Freeman (born 1953), NFL defensive back, game official
 Hugh Freeze (born 1969), college football coach
 Jake Gibbs (born 1938), MLB catcher, college coach
 Jennifer Gillom (born 1964), WNBA player/Olympic gold medalist and coach, born in  Abbeville
 Sam Kendricks (born 1992), pole vaulter, 2017 world champion, 2016 Olympic medalist
 Andy Kennedy (born 1968), college basketball coach 
 Don Kessinger (born 1942), MLB shortstop, manager, realtor
 Lane Kiffin (born 1975), NFL and college football coach
 Henry Lamar (1906–1985), football coach, born in Oxford
 Archie Manning (born 1949), NFL quarterback
 Eli Manning (born 1981), NFL quarterback
 DK Metcalf [born 1997), NFL wide receiver, born in Oxford
 Alex Mullen (memory athlete) (born 1992), world memory champion, raised in Oxford
 Michael Oher (born 1986), NFL offensive tackle
 Connie Price-Smith (born 1962), track and field coach
 Jim Poole (1915–1994) NFL wide receiver, born in Oxford
 Culley Rikard (1914–2000), MLB outfielder, born in Oxford
 Steve Sloan (born 1944), college football coach
 Armegis Spearman (born 1978), NFL linebacker, born in Oxford
 Jim Urbanek (born 1945), AFL defensive tackle, born in Oxford
 Johnny Vaught (1909–2006), football coach
 Todd Wade (born 1976), NFL offensive tackle
 Justin Woodall (born 1987), baseball pitcher, born in Oxford
 Lorenzen Wright (1975–2010), professional basketball player

Authors
 Ace Atkins (born 1970), journalist, novelist
 Howard Bahr (born 1946), novelist
 William Boyle (born 1978), novelist
 Larry Brown (1951–2004), novelist, short story writer
 Tim Earley (born 1972), poet
 John T. Edge, food writer
 John Faulkner (1901–1963), plain-style writer, brother of William Faulkner
 William Faulkner (1897–1962), novelist, Nobel laureate
 Beth Ann Fennelly (born 1971), poet
 Ann Fisher-Wirth (born 1947), poet
 Richard Ford (born 1944), novelist, short story writer
 Tom Franklin (born 1962), novelist
 David Galef (born 1959), novelist, short story writer, translator
 John Grisham (born 1955), legal thrillers novelist
 Barry Hannah (1942–2010), novelist and short story writer
 Kiese Laymon (born 1974), novelist, memoirist 
 Jonathan Miles (born 1971), journalist, novelist
 Willie Morris (1934–1999), author, editor
 Aimee Nezhukumatathil (born 1974), poet
 Chris Offutt (born 1958), author, screenwriter
 J.E. Pitts (1967-2010), poet, editor, artist
 Michael Farris Smith, author
 Wright Thompson (born 1976), sports writer
 Stark Young (1881–1963), playwright/novelist/literary critic/essayist

Educators
 F.A.P. Barnard (1809–1889), scientist, parson, UM chancellor
 Alexander Lee Bondurant (1865-1937), classicist, football coach
 Glenn Boyce (born 1958), UM chancellor
 Alfred Benjamin Butts (1890-1962), UM chancellor
 William R. Ferris (born 1942), folklorist, chairman of National Endowment for the Humanities
 Porter Lee Fortune Jr. (1920–1989), UM chancellor
 Robert Burwell Fulton (1849-1914), physicist, UM chancellor
 Arthur Guyton (1919–2003), physiologist, author of Textbook of Medical Physiology
 Eugene W. Hilgard (1833–1916), soil chemist
 Thomas Hines (born 1936), architectural historian
 George Frederick Holmes (1820–1897), first UM chancellor
 Alfred Hume (1866-1950), mathematician, UM chancellor
 Dan Jones (born 1949), physician, UM chancellor
 Winthrop Jordan (1931–2007), historian
 Robert Khayat (born 1938), UM chancellor
 Andrew Armstrong Kincannon (1859-1938), UM chancellor
 Augustus Baldwin Longstreet (1790-1870) attorney, preacher, author, UM president
 Edward Mayes (1846–1917), attorney, UM chancellor
 Louis Pojman (1935-2005), philosopher
 Franklin Lafayette Riley Jr. (1868–1929), historian
 David Moore Robinson (1880–1958), classical archaeologist
 Ronald J. Rychlak (born 1957), attorney, legal scholar
 Alexander P. Stewart (1821–1908), Confederate general, UM chancellor
 R. Gerald Turner (born 1945), UM chancellor
 Jeffrey Vitter (born 1955), computer scientist, UM chancellor
 John Davis Williams (1902-1983), UM chancellor during Meredith crisis

Entrepreneurs and business leaders
 Joseph Whitehead (1864–1906), Coca-Cola pioneer, born in Oxford

Journalists, media figures
 Ron Franklin (born 1942), sportscaster
 Lee Habeeb (born 1961), conservative talk radio producer
 Samir Husni (born 1953), magazine industry analyst
 Angela McGlowan (born 1970), Fox News political commentator, born in Oxford
 Shepard Smith (born 1964), Fox News, CNBC anchor
 Wright Thompson (born 1976), senior writer for ESPN.com and ESPN The Magazine
 Curtis Wilkie (born 1940), journalist, historian

Jurists and lawyers
 Neal Brooks Biggers Jr. (born 1935), U.S. district judge
 Robert Andrews Hill (1811–1900), U.S. district judge
 Charles Bowen Howry (1844-1928), assistant U.S. attorney general, U.S. court of claims judge
 Frank Hampton McFadden (born 1925), U.S. district judge, born in Oxford
 Richard Scruggs (born 1946), attorney
 Phil Stone (1893-1967), attorney

Military figures
 Daniel Isom Sultan (1885–1947), inspector general, U.S. Army, born in Oxford

Musicians
 Bass Drum of Death, garage rock band
 Beanland, jam band
 Miklos Bencze (1911-1992), operatic basso
 Blue Mountain, alternative country band,
 R. L. Burnside (1926–2005), blues singer-songwriter, born in Lafayette County
 Phil Cohran (born 1927), jazz musician, born in Oxford
 Colour Revolt, indie rock band
 The Cooters, punk metal band
 Adam Gussow (born 1958), blues harmonica player, teacher
 JoJo Hermann, musician
 Caroline Herring, singer-songwriter
 Dennis Herring, record producer
 Cary Hudson (born 1965), lead singer and guitarist for alternative country band Blue Mountain
 Pepper Keenan (born 1967), metal guitarist, singer, born in Oxford
 Arthur Kreutz (1906-1991), composer
 Kudzu Kings, band
 Jimbo Mathus (born 1967), musician, born in Oxford
 Dent May, alt-musician, ukulele player
 George McConnell, guitarist
 Shannon McNally (born 1973), singer-songwriter
 Laurie Stirratt (born 1967), bassist
 Young Buffalo, indie rock band

Politicians
 Nicole Akins Boyd, state senator
 Thad Cochran (born 1937), U.S. senator
 Ronald D. Coleman (born 1941), U.S. representative (Texas)
 Lewis P. Featherstone (1851-1922), U.S. representative (Arkansas), born in Oxford
 Bill Hawks (born 1944), planter, state senator, born in Oxford
 Charles Bowen Howry (1844–1928), state representative, assistant U.S. attorney general, born in Oxford
 Jay Hughes (born 1963), state representative
 L.Q.C. Lamar (1825–1893), U.S. senator, supreme court justice
 William Lee J. Lowrance (1836-1916), Confederate colonel, merchant, state representative
 Donald Stuart Russell (1906–1998), governor, U.S. senator (South Carolina), born in Lafayette County
 Lee M. Russell (1875–1943), U.S. representative, governor
 William V. Sullivan (1857–1918), U.S. senator
 Gray Tollison (born 1964), state senator
 Jacob Thompson (1810–1885), U.S. representative, secretary of the interior
 Bill Waller (1926–2011), governor, born in Lafayette County
 Jamie L. Whitten (1910–1995), U.S. representative
 Thomas Hickman Williams (1801–1851), U.S. senator, UM secretary-treasurer, "father of the University of Mississippi"
 Samuel Andrew Witherspoon (1855–1915), UM professor, U.S. representative

Religious figures
 Larry M. Goodpaster (born 1948), Methodist bishop
 Duncan M. Gray III (born 1949), Episcopal bishop of Mississippi
 Alexander Preston Shaw (1879-1966), Methodist bishop, born in Abbeville

References

Ox